Michael A. Cox Sr. (born June 17, 1965) is an American police officer, currently serving as the commissioner of the Boston Police Department.

Career
In 1995, while a member of the Boston Police Department (BPD), Cox was severely beaten by fellow officers while working in plain clothes. The incident was initially "swept under the rug", but a lawsuit ultimately led to BPD settling with Cox for $900,000 in damages and attorneys' fees. His story was the subject of the book The Fence, written by author and former reporter Dick Lehr of The Boston Globe.

As of 2013, Cox had advanced to Deputy Superintendent in the BPD. By 2019, Cox had advanced to Superintendent, the second highest rank in the BPD, serving as leading the Bureau of Professional Development and the Police Academy.

In September 2019, Cox was sworn in as the chief of police for Ann Arbor, Michigan.

In July 2022, Cox was announced as the incoming commissioner of the Boston police by Mayor of Boston Michelle Wu. He was officially sworn in on August 15, 2022.

Personal life
, Cox was married with three children. At that time, an article in The New York Times about Cox's 1995 beating identified one of his children as former UMass Minutemen and New York Giants running back Michael Cox.

Notes

References

External links
 1995 Beating by Boston Police Highlights Dangers for Black Undercover Officers
 Internal affairs report cites Boston officer for use of unreasonable force
 David C. Williams: Twice-Fired Boston Police Officer Gets His Job Back

Living people
1965 births
People from Boston
African-American police officers
American police officers
Boston Police Department officers
Commissioners of the Boston Police Department
21st-century African-American people
20th-century African-American people